Joyous Lake is an album by guitarist Pat Martino which was recorded in 1976 and first released on the Warner Bros. label.

Reception

The AllMusic site rated the album with 3 stars.

In an article for All About Jazz, Ian Patterson wrote: "The group interplay is tight and the soloing exhilarating, with Martino in exceptional, bebop-inspired form. Yet there is a melodicism within these grooves that seems to foreshadow the Pat Metheny Group... the record has stood the test of time, and for jazz-fusion fans anyway, it ranks as one of Martino's best."

All About Jazz's John Kelman remarked: "for those who enjoy their fusion with a stronger tie to the tradition, even as its grooves and colors are irrefutably electric and in their energy, electrified, Joyous Lake remains an undervalued gem in Martino's discography, and one that absolutely merits rediscovery."

Jim Campilongo, writing for Guitar Player, praised the album's "athletic impassioned playing, almost impossible unison lines, and yes, one could use the F word – fusion – to describe it accurately." He stated that Martino's "artistry is captured in spades on Joyous Lake."

Track listing 
All compositions by Pat Martino except as indicated
 "Line Games" - 3:55
 "Pyramidal Vision" (Delmar Brown) - 7:42
 "Mardi Gras" (Brown) - 8:56
 "M'Wandishi" (Kenwood Dennard) - 5:29
 "Song Bird" - 7:55
 "Joyous Lake" - 7:33

Personnel 
Pat Martino - guitar, EML 101 synthesizer, percussion
Delmar Brown - electric piano, Oberheim polyphonic, EML 500
 Mark Leonard  - electric bass
Kenwood Dennard - drums, percussion

References 

Pat Martino albums
1977 albums
Warner Records albums
Albums produced by Paul A. Rothchild